NextGen Healthcare, Inc. is an American software and services company headquartered in Atlanta, Georgia. The company develops and sells electronic health record (EHR) software and practice management systems to the healthcare industry. NextGen Healthcare also provides population health, financial management, and clinical solutions for medical and dental practices. On September 7, 2018, Quality Systems, Inc. changed its name to NextGen Healthcare, Inc. and on September 10, their stock ticker symbol changed to NASDAQ: NXGN.

History

Quality Systems, Inc. (QSI) was formed by Sheldon Razin in 1973 in Corona, California, as a dental software company. Sheldon started QSI in his home study with $2,000, and built it into a business with a market capitalization of over a billion dollars, with no debt or venture funding.

QSI was incorporated in April 1974.

In December 1982, QSI went public through NASDAQ under the symbol QSII.

In 1994, Clinitec was formed by Pat Cline and Bryan Rosenberger to sell software for converting paper medical records into electronic medical records. After acquiring a smaller interest in 1995, QSI purchased the remaining equity of Clinitec in 1996.

In May 1997, QSI purchased Micromed, which provided front- and back office practice management software. In April 1999, QSI combined Clinitec and MicroMed into one operating division to create the MicroMed division, which was later renamed NextGen Healthcare Information Systems division in 2001.

In 2008, NextGen Healthcare then acquired HSI of St. Louis, Missouri, and Practice Management Partners of Hunt Valley, Maryland, to expand its billing services and revenue cycle consulting division.

In 2009, NextGen Healthcare updated the name of its electronic medical record system from NextGen EMR to NextGen EHR.

In February 2010, Quality Systems entered into an agreement to acquire Opus Healthcare Solutions, Inc. and announced it would be integrated with the assets of Sphere Health Systems, Inc., which were acquired by QSI in August 2009. Both software and services companies for the inpatient market would become part of NextGen Healthcare.

In October 2010, NextGen Ambulatory EHR v.5.6.SP1 earned certification for Stage 1 Meaningful Use to support eligible providers in receiving funding under the American Recovery and Reinvestment Act (ARRA). NextGen Inpatient Clinicals v.2.4 earned Stage 1 Meaningful Use certification to support hospitals in December 2010. Version 5.6 certified reporting makes extensive use of included add-on Crystal Reports which mine data from the EHR database.

Pat Cline retired from NextGen in 2011, and started up a new health informatics venture: Lightbeam Health Solutions.

In 2013, Quality Systems acquired Mirth Corporation, developers of Mirth Connect, a popular open-source integration engine used by thousands of healthcare entities.

In 2013, NextGen was ranked as one of the Top 20 Most Popular EHR Software Solutions on the market by Capterra.

In 2014, NextGen earned KLAS Top Performance Honors for Ambulatory RCM Services.

On October 30, 2015, Quality Systems announced an agreement to acquire HealthFusion for $165 million-plus potential additional contingent consideration of up to $25 million. Based in San Diego, Calif., HealthFusion was a privately held developer of web-based software for physicians, hospitals and medical billing services.

In October 2019, NextGen Healthcare acquired Topaz Information Solutions.

In November 2019, NextGen Healthcare announced the acquisition of Medfusion and completed the acquisition in December 2019.

In December 2019, NextGen Healthcare announced an agreement to acquire OTTO Health

Products and services 

NextGen Healthcare's products include:

 NextGen Enterprise Ambulatory EHR (Electronic Health Record). The NextGen EHR is primarily a single, all-encompassing database that combines user management, EHR and EPM. This database can run under MS SQL Server 2005, 2008 or Oracle.
 NextGen Practice Management. Shares the same database backend as the core EHR product.
 NextGen Office
 NextGen Patient Portal
 NextGen Health Data Hub
 NextGen Health Quality Measures
 NextGen Advanced Auditing
 NextGen Mobile
 NextGen Rosetta interface platform
 Mirth Connect acquired September 2013 

NextGen Healthcare's services include:

 Revenue Cycle Management (RCM)
 NextGen EDI Services
 NextGuard Data Protection

Former products

 NextGen Inpatient Clinicals acquired by Quadramed in 2015 
 NextGen Inpatient Financials  acquired by Quadramed in 2015

References

External links
 
 
 Quality Systems Acquires Opus Healthcare Solutions - Healthcare Innovation article
 Quality Systems, Inc. Announces Agreement to Acquire HealthFusion Holdings, Inc. - Businesswire article

Healthcare software companies
Electronic health records
Electronic health record software companies
Software companies established in 1973
Companies listed on the Nasdaq
Software companies of the United States